Butts is an unincorporated community in Jenkins County, Georgia, United States.

History
A post office was established at Butts in 1891, and remained in operation until being discontinued in 1931. Butts was located on the Georgia & Florida Railroad.

References

Unincorporated communities in Jenkins County, Georgia
Unincorporated communities in Georgia (U.S. state)